Monochroa simplicella is a moth of the family Gelechiidae. It is found in Russia (the southern Ural and the central part of European Russia), Belarus, Slovakia, Germany, Italy, Hungary, Finland and the Baltic region. Outside of Europe, it is found in the Altai and in Irkutskaya oblast.

References

Moths described in 1846
Monochroa
Moths of Europe